Ann Charney (born 1940) is a Canadian novelist, short story writer and journalist.

Career 
Her most recent novel, Life Class was published in 2013. It is a story of displacement and ambition played out in the art circles of Venice, New York and Montreal and is dedicated to her late husband, the artist Melvin Charney who died in September 2012.

Her previous novel is Distantly Related to Freud, the coming of age story of a young girl, who dreams of becoming a writer and a femme fatale.

Her most widely published novel is Dobryd, the story of a child discovering freedom amid the chaos of war's aftermath.

Charney has been a columnist for the magazine Maclean's, and a frequent contributor to Saturday Night, Ms., and other leading US and Canadian publications.

Her work has been published in Canada, the US, France, Germany and Italy.

Awards and honors

She has won Canadian National Magazine Awards both for her fiction and non-fiction, the Canadian Authors' Association Prize for non-fiction, was a finalist for a QSPELL Award for Defiance in their Eyes, and was made an officer of the French Order of Arts and Letters.

References

External links 
 Official website
Writers Union of Canada Web site 
Quebec Writers Federation Web site

Living people
20th-century Canadian novelists
21st-century Canadian novelists
Canadian people of Polish descent
Canadian women journalists
Canadian women novelists
20th-century Canadian women writers
21st-century Canadian women writers
Canadian women non-fiction writers
1940 births